Rene Robert Joliat (April 25, 1898 – August 10, 1953) was a Canadian professional ice hockey right winger who played one season in the National Hockey League for the Montreal Canadiens. Joliat's brother Aurel Joliat also played in the NHL.

Playing career
Born in Ottawa, Ontario, Joliat played only one NHL regular season game in his career during the 1924–25 season. Joliat retired in 1930.

See also
List of players who played only one game in the NHL

References

External links

1898 births
1953 deaths
Canadian ice hockey right wingers
Ice hockey people from Ottawa
Montreal Canadiens players